Chrysina aurigans is a species of scarab beetle found in Costa Rica. It is notable for its golden color.

References 

Rutelinae
Beetles of Central America